This is a list of villages and settlements in Abia State, Nigeria organised by local government area (LGA) and district/area (with postal codes also given).

By postal code
Below is a list of polling units, which includes villages and schools, organised by postal code

By electoral ward
Below is a list of polling units, including villages and schools, organised by electoral ward.

References

Abia
Populated places in Abia State